Ten is a British action drama film, directed and written by Craig Wyting, starring Colin Burt Vidler, Claire Walmsley,  Danny Howard. The film was mostly shot at the Hythe area of the town of Colchester. The film is loosely based on the author's experiences as a soldier in the British Army, and examines how society treats former soldiers.

The film was produced by previous winner of the Coup de Coeur at the Cannes Film Festival, Darren Cook of Scruffy Bear Pictures. The cast and crew volunteered their time to work on the production, with any money raised to be split between military charities, the Royal British Legion, the Invicta Foundation and 353.

Premise
The film's plot centers on a Company Sergeant Major who is on his tenth tour, and is about to leave the Army.

Cast
 Colin Burt Vidler as Company Sergeant Major Glenn Knox
 Claire Walmsley as Cassie Read
 Chris Martin Hill as  color sergeant fletcher 
 Danny Howard as John
 David Jon as Sergeant Morgan
 Mitch Hill as Sergeant Philips
 Kumud Pant as Insurgent

Release
The film was released on the Amazon Prime platform on 1 December 2016.

References

External links
 
 

2013 films
2010s war films
British action drama films
Films set in Afghanistan
Films shot in England
Films shot in London
2010s English-language films
2010s British films